The Sun Moon Legend, also known as The Young Moon Legend(新月傳奇 'Saan Yuet Chuen Gei.), is a 1980 Taiwanese film adapted from Xinyue Chuanqi of Gu Long's Chu Liuxiang novel series. The film was directed by Wang Yu and starred Meng Fei as the lead character.

Cast
Meng Fei as Chu Liuxiang
Ling Yun as Prince Arrow
Wong Goon-hung as Bai Yunsheng
Sek Fung as Hu Tiehua
Yeung Gwan-gwan as Crescent
Grace Chan as Aunt Hua
Su Chen-ping as Manager Hua
Got Heung-ting as Chao Lin
Luk Yat-lung as King Warrior
Wong Chung-yue as Black Bamboo
Chan Gwan-biu
Chan Chung-yung
Li Jian-ping
Fung Gwan-ping
Ma Cheung
Got Siu-bo

External links

1980 films
Taiwanese martial arts films
Wuxia films
Works based on Chu Liuxiang (novel series)
Films based on works by Gu Long